Lucas Fernando Copado Schrobenhauser (born 10 January 2004) is a German professional footballer who plays as a centre-forward for German club Bayern Munich II.

Club career
Copado played for the youth team of SpVgg Unterhaching until 2016, when he joined the Bayern Munich youth academy. He made his debut for Bayern Munich II in the Regionalliga Bayern on 27 August 2021, coming on as a substitute in the 67th minute for Nemanja Motika against 1860 Rosenheim. He scored in the 81st minute, with the match finishing as a 6–0 win. In January 2022, Copado was called up by Julian Nagelsmann to the Bayern Munich first team, as many of the team's regulars were missing after testing positive for COVID-19. He made his professional debut for Bayern in the Bundesliga on 7 January 2022 against Borussia Mönchengladbach, coming on as a substitute in the 75th minute for Malik Tillman. The match finished as a 2–1 home loss for Bayern.

International career
Copado has played friendly internationals for the Germany under-15 to under-18 national teams.

Personal life
Copado was born in Munich, and is the son of Eva Schrobenhauser and former footballer Francisco Copado. His father Francisco is a dual Spanish-German citizen, having been born in Kiel to Spanish migrant workers. Lucas is also the nephew of retired Bosnian international footballer and Bayern Munich sporting director Hasan Salihamidžić (who married Esther Copado, the sister of Francisco Copado). Hasan's son and Lucas' cousin, Nick Salihamidžić, is also a footballer who has played for the Bayern Munich youth and second teams.

Career statistics

Club

References

External links
 
 

2004 births
Living people
Footballers from Munich
German footballers
Germany youth international footballers
Spanish footballers
German people of Spanish descent
Association football forwards
FC Bayern Munich II players
FC Bayern Munich footballers
Bundesliga players
Regionalliga players